Blake Richardson may refer to:

Blake Richardson (drummer), American drummer for American progressive metal band Between the Buried and Me, as well as the former drummer for the deathcore band Glass Casket
Blake Richardson (singer) British singer, member of British band New Hope Club